The 2019–20 season was Shirak's 29th consecutive season in the Armenian Premier League.

Season events
On 12 March 2020, the Football Federation of Armenia announced that all Armenian Premier League games had been postponed until 23 March due to the COVID-19 pandemic.

Squad

Out on loan

Transfers

In

Loans out

Released

Friendlies

Competitions

Premier League

Regular season

Results summary

Results

Table

Championship round

Results summary

Results

Table

Armenian Cup

Statistics

Appearances and goals

|-
|colspan="16"|Players who left Shirak during the season:

|}

Goal scorers

Clean sheets

Disciplinary Record

References

Shirak SC seasons
Shirak